The Kansas City Royals are a Major League Baseball franchise based in Kansas City, Missouri. The franchise, founded in 1969, plays in the American League Central division. Since the institution of Major League Baseball's Rule 4 Draft, the Royals have selected 57 players in the first round. Officially known as the "First-Year Player Draft", the Rule 4 Draft is Major League Baseball's primary mechanism for assigning amateur players from high schools, colleges, and other amateur baseball clubs to its franchises. The draft order is determined based on the previous season's standings with the team that had the worst record receiving the first pick. In addition, teams that lost free agents in the previous off-season may be awarded compensatory or supplementary picks. The First-Year Player Draft is unrelated to the 1968 expansion draft in which the Royals initially filled their roster.

Of the 57 players first-round draft picks, 31 have been pitchers, the most of any position; 20 of these were right-handed, while 11 were left-handed. Twelve outfielders were selected, and eight shortstops, three catchers, and two third basemen were taken. The team also selected one player at first base, but has never drafted a second baseman. Fifteen of the players came from institutions in the state of California, while Florida and Texas follow with seven players each. The Royals have drafted two players, Luke Hochevar (2006) and Aaron Crow (2009), who were playing in the American Association of Independent Professional Baseball at the time of their draft. Both had been drafted previously by other major league teams but had chosen to play for the Fort Worth Cats instead. They have also drafted one player from Puerto Rico: Juan Lebron (1995).

Seven of their first-round picks have won World Series championships with the team. Outfielder Willie Wilson (1974) and shortstop Buddy Biancalana (1978) appeared during the Royals' 1985 World Series victory, while Alex Gordon (2005), Luke Hochevar (2006), Mike Moustakas (2007), Eric Hosmer (2008) and Christian Colón (2010) were all part of the winning team in the 2015 World Series. Zack Greinke (2002) is the only first-round pick of the Royals to earn a Cy Young Award with the team, winning in 2009. Royals' first-round picks have never won Rookie of the Year or Most Valuable Player awards, and no pick has been elected to the Hall of Fame. The Royals have made seven selections in the supplemental round of the draft. They have made the first overall selection in the draft once, in 2006. The club has had 13 compensatory picks since the institution of the First-Year Player Draft in 1965. These additional picks are provided when a team loses a particularly valuable free agent in the prior off-season, or, more recently, if a team fails to sign a draft pick from the previous year. The Royals' first-ever pick, John Simmons (1969), did not sign with the club but they received no compensatory pick.

Key

Picks

See also
Kansas City Royals minor league players

Footnotes
 Through the 2012 draft, free agents were evaluated by the Elias Sports Bureau and rated "Type A", "Type B", or not compensation-eligible. If a team offered arbitration to a player but that player refused and subsequently signed with another team, the original team was able to receive additional draft picks. If a "Type A" free agent left in this way, his previous team received a supplemental pick and a compensatory pick from the team with which he signed. If a "Type B" free agent left in this way, his previous team received only a supplemental pick. Since the 2013 draft, free agents are no longer classified by type; instead, compensatory picks are only awarded if the team offered its free agent a contract worth at least the average of the 125 current richest MLB contracts. However, if the free agent's last team acquired the player in a trade during the last year of his contract, it is ineligible to receive compensatory picks for that player.
The Royals lost their first-round pick in 1990 to the San Diego Padres as compensation for signing free agent Mark Davis.
The Royals gained a supplemental first-round pick in 1991 for losing free agent Steve Farr.
The Royals gained a compensatory first-round pick in 1992 from the San Diego Padres for losing free agent Kurt Stillwell.
The Royals gained a supplemental first-round pick in 1992 for losing free agent Danny Tartabull.
The Royals gained a supplemental first-round pick in 1992 for losing free agent Kurt Stillwell.
The Royals gained a compensatory first-round pick in 1998 from the Arizona Diamondbacks for losing free agent Jay Bell.
The Royals gained a supplemental first-round pick in 1998 for losing free agent Jay Bell.
The Royals gained a compensatory first-round pick in 1999 from the Boston Red Sox for losing free agent José Offerman.
The Royals gained a supplemental first-round pick in 1999 for losing free agent José Offerman.
The Royals gained a supplemental first-round pick in 1999 for losing free agent Dean Palmer.
The Royals gained a compensatory first-round pick in 2003 from the Atlanta Braves for losing free agent Paul Byrd.
The Royals gained a compensatory first-round pick in 2004 from the San Francisco Giants for losing free agent Michael Tucker.
The Royals gained a supplemental first-round pick in 2004 for losing free agent Raúl Ibañez.
The Royals gained a compensatory first-round pick in 2008 from the Milwaukee Brewers for losing free agent David Riske.
The Royals gained an extra first-round pick in 2013 as a result of the 2012 Competitive Balance Lottery.

References
General references

In-text citations

First-round draft picks
Kansas City Royals first-round draft picks